Alcterogystia frater is a moth in the family Cossidae. It is found in Yemen and Saudi Arabia.

References

Natural History Museum Lepidoptera generic names catalog

Cossinae
Moths described in 1929
Moths of the Middle East